Ayaka Kikuchi may refer to:

, Japanese singer, actress, model and idol
, Japanese speed skater